The 1968 NCAA University Division Golf Championship was the 30th annual NCAA-sanctioned golf tournament to determine the individual and team national champions of men's collegiate golf in the United States.

The tournament was held at the New Mexico State University Golf Course in Las Cruces, New Mexico.

Florida won the team title, the Gators' first NCAA team national title.

Individual results

Individual champion
 Grier Jones, Oklahoma State

Team results

Note: Top 10 only
DC = Defending champions

References

NCAA Men's Golf Championship
Golf in New Mexico
NCAA Golf Championship
NCAA Golf Championship
NCAA Golf Championship